Pleasant Valley is a town in Eau Claire County, Wisconsin, United States. The population was 3,044 at the 2010 census. The town government is headquartered in the unincorporated community of Cleghorn. The remains of the historic community of Hadleyville are also located in the town.

Geography
According to the United States Census Bureau, the town has a total area of 54.2 square miles (140.4 km2), all of it land.

Demographics

As of the census of 2000, there were 2,681 people, 919 households, and 779 families residing in the town. The population density was 49.5 people per square mile (19.1/km2).  There were 931 housing units at an average density of 17.2 per square mile (6.6/km2). The racial makeup of the town was 97.84% White, 0.30% Native American, 1.08% Asian, 0.60% from other races, and 0.19% from two or more races. Hispanic or Latino of any race were 1.27% of the population.

There were 919 households, out of which 42.7% had children under the age of 18 living with them, 77.8% were married couples living together, 3.8% had a female householder with no husband present, and 15.2% were non-families. 12.7% of all households were made up of individuals, and 4.4% had someone living alone who was 65 years of age or older. The average household size was 2.91 and the average family size was 3.17.

The population was 29.9% under the age of 18, 5.1% from 18 to 24, 29.3% from 25 to 44, 27.6% from 45 to 64, and 8.0% who were 65 years of age or older. The median age was 38 years. For every 100 females, there were 108.2 males. For every 100 females age 18 and over, there were 106.0 males.

The median income for a household in the town was $61,645, and the median income for a family was $67,656. Males had a median income of $37,409 versus $27,467 for females. The per capita income for the town was $23,539. About 1.0% of families and 2.0% of the population were below the poverty line, including 0.5% of those under age 18 and 3.9% of those age 65 or over.

Notable people
C. N. Saugen, Wisconsin State Representative

References

Towns in Eau Claire County, Wisconsin
Eau Claire–Chippewa Falls metropolitan area
Towns in Wisconsin